Martin Lee Pollard (born 2 August 1977) is an English cricketer.  Pollard is a right-handed batsman who bowls right-arm medium-fast.  He was born in Shotley Bridge, County Durham.

Pollard made his debut for Northumberland in the 2001 Minor Counties Championship against the Hertfordshire.  Pollard played Minor counties cricket for Northumberland from 2001 to 2006, which included 19 Minor Counties Championship matches and 17 MCCA Knockout Trophy matches.  He made his List A debut against Staffordshire in the 2nd round of the 2002 Cheltenham & Gloucester Trophy which was held in 2001.  He played 2 further List A matches, against Leicestershire in the 2003 Cheltenham & Gloucester Trophy and Middlesex in the 2005 Cheltenham & Gloucester Trophy.  In his 3 List A matches, he took 2 wickets at a bowling average of 39.50, with best figures of 1/18.
He currently plays for Blaydon CC in the North East Premier League, having done so since 2009. Previously he played for Benwell Hill, Ashington, Gateshead Fell, Halesowen and Moseley Ashfield.

References

External links
Martin Pollard at ESPNcricinfo
Martin Pollard at CricketArchive

1977 births
Living people
English cricketers
Northumberland cricketers
People from Shotley Bridge
Cricketers from County Durham